The Is Molas Senior Open was a men's senior (over 50) professional golf tournament on the European Seniors Tour, held at the Is Molas Golf Club in Pula, Sardinia, Italy. It was held just once, in October 1998, and was won by Malcolm Gregson who finished two shots ahead of Tommy Horton. Total prize money was £90,000 with the winner receiving £14,500.

Winners

References

External links
Coverage on the European Senior Tour's official site

Former European Senior Tour events
Golf tournaments in Italy
Sport in Sardinia